Sky Classic (March 17, 1987 – April 30, 2015) was a Canadian Thoroughbred Hall of Fame racehorse. A son of U.K. Triple Crown champion Nijinsky, in 1989 Sky Classic won the Sovereign Award for Champion 2-Year-Old Male Horse in Canada but injuries kept him out for the most of the 1990 racing season.

Back racing on grass in 1991, Sky Classic won six of his nine starts including the prestigious Rothmans International in course record time. The following year with Pat Day riding, he set a new race record in the Arlington Handicap, defeated Fraise in the Turf Classic Invitational at Belmont Park, but lost his two biggest races that year, a second in the Arlington Million to Dear Doctor, and another second by a nose to Fraise in the Breeders' Cup Turf. However, his five other wins that year earned him the 1992 United States Eclipse Award for Outstanding Male Turf Horse.

Retired in 1993, Sky Classic stood stud at Pin Oak Stud, LLC in Versailles, Kentucky.  He has sired more than 50 Graded stakes race winners including:
 Thornfield (b. 1994) - 1999 Canadian Horse of the Year
 Nothing To Lose (b. 2000) - Multiple stakes winner including the G1 Turf Mile Stakes
 Sky Conqueror (b. 2002) - Canadian Champion Male Turf Horse (2006) Grade 1 winner in U.S., career earnings $1,720,699
 Hyperbaric (b. 2003) - won G1 Citation Handicap, G2 Oak Tree Mile Stakes

Sky Classic was inducted in the Canadian Horse Racing Hall of Fame in 1998. He died in his paddock an Pin Oak on 30 April 2015.

References

 Sky Classic's pedigree and stats
 Sky Classic at the Canadian Horse Racing Hall of Fame

1987 racehorse births
2015 racehorse deaths
Racehorses bred in Canada
Racehorses trained in Canada
Horse racing track record setters
Sovereign Award winners
Eclipse Award winners
Canadian Horse Racing Hall of Fame inductees
Thoroughbred family 23-b